Statistics of 1. deild in the 2004 season.

Overview
It was contested by 10 teams, and Havnar Bóltfelag won the championship.

League standings

Results
The schedule consisted of a total of 18 games. Each team played two games against every opponent in no particular order. One of the games was at home and one was away.

Top goalscorers
Source: faroesoccer.com

13 goals
 Sonni L. Petersen (EB/Streymur)

12 goals
 Súni Olsen (GÍ)
 Rógvi Jacobsen (HB)

9 goals
 Jacob Bymar (KÍ)
 Jónhard Frederiksberg (Skála)

8 goals
 John Petersen (B36)
 Heine Fernandez (HB)
 Bogi Gregersen (Skála)

7 goals
 Egil á Bø (B36)
 Anderson Cardena (B68)
 Sorin Anghel (EB/Streymur)
 Heðin á Lakjuni (HB)
 Høgni Zachariassen (ÍF)
 Erling Fles (KÍ)

References

1. deild seasons
Faroe
Faroe
1